Bogdan Kourinnoi (born 15 December 1993) is a Swedish Greco-Roman wrestler. In 2020, he won one of the bronze medals in the 82 kg event at the 2020 European Wrestling Championships held in Rome, Italy.

Career 

He competed in the 80 kg event at the 2017 European Wrestling Championships held in Novi Sad, Serbia.

In 2019, he competed in the 82 kg event at the 2019 World Wrestling Championships held in Nur-Sultan, Kazakhstan. He was eliminated in his first match by Zoltán Lévai of Hungary.

Major results

References

External links 

 

Living people
1993 births
Place of birth missing (living people)
Swedish male sport wrestlers
European Wrestling Championships medalists
20th-century Swedish people
21st-century Swedish people